Kelsey-Tisdale was a provincial electoral district for the Legislative Assembly of the province of Saskatchewan, Canada, encompassing the towns of Hudson Bay, Carrot River, and Tisdale.

Created as "Tisdale-Kelsey" before the 17th Saskatchewan general election in 1971, this riding was dissolved before the 23rd Saskatchewan general election in 1995. It is now part of the constituencies of Melfort and Carrot River Valley.

Members of the Legislative Assembly

Tisdale-Kelsey (1971–1975)

Kelsey-Tisdale (1975–1995)

Election results

|-
 
|style="width: 130px"|NDP
|John Rissler Messer
|align="right"|4,761
|align="right"|57.84%
|align="right"|–

 
|Prog. Conservative
|Walter Lisitza
|align="right"|420
|align="right"|5.10%
|align="right"|–
|- bgcolor="white"
!align="left" colspan=3|Total
!align="right"|8,231
!align="right"|100.00%
!align="right"|

|-
 
|style="width: 130px"|NDP
|John Rissler Messer
|align="right"|3,750
|align="right"|47.79%
|align="right"|−10.05

 
|Progressive Conservative
|Jack Ukrainetz
|align="right"|1,831
|align="right"|23.33%
|align="right"|+18.23
|- bgcolor="white"
!align="left" colspan=3|Total
!align="right"|7,847
!align="right"|100.00%
!align="right"|

|-
 
|style="width: 130px"|NDP
|John Rissler Messer
|align="right"|4,031
|align="right"|50.27%
|align="right"|+2.48
 
|Progressive Conservative
|Neal Hardy
|align="right"|3,461
|align="right"|43.16%
|align="right"|+19.83

|- bgcolor="white"
!align="left" colspan=3|Total
!align="right"|8,019
!align="right"|100.00%
!align="right"|

|-
 
|style="width: 130px"|Progressive Conservative
|Neal Hardy
|align="right"|3,334
|align="right"|48.39%
|align="right"|+5.23
 
|NDP
|Lars Bracken
|align="right"|3,232
|align="right"|46.91%
|align="right"|−3.36

|- bgcolor="white"
!align="left" colspan=3|Total
!align="right"|6,890
!align="right"|100.00%
!align="right"|

|-
 
|style="width: 130px"|Progressive Conservative
|Neal Hardy
|align="right"|5,171
|align="right"|60.81%
|align="right"|+12.42
 
|NDP
|Francis E. Schmeichel
|align="right"|2,878
|align="right"|33.84%
|align="right"|−13.07

|- bgcolor="white"
!align="left" colspan=3|Total
!align="right"|8,504
!align="right"|100.00%
!align="right"|

|-
 
|style="width: 130px"|Progressive Conservative
|Neal Hardy
|align="right"|4,448
|align="right"|54.19%
|align="right"|−6.62
 
|NDP
|Mike Martyn
|align="right"|3,452
|align="right"|42.05%
|align="right"|+8.21

|- bgcolor="white"
!align="left" colspan=3|Total
!align="right"|8,209
!align="right"|100.00%
!align="right"|

|-
 
|style="width: 130px"|NDP
|Andy Renaud
|align="right"|3,871
|align="right"|51.57%
|align="right"|+9.52
 
|Prog. Conservative
|Neal Hardy
|align="right"|2,783
|align="right"|37.07%
|align="right"|−17.12

|- bgcolor="white"
!align="left" colspan=3|Total
!align="right"|7,507
!align="right"|100.00%
!align="right"|

See also
Electoral district (Canada)
List of Saskatchewan provincial electoral districts
List of Saskatchewan general elections
List of political parties in Saskatchewan

References
 Saskatchewan Archives Board – Saskatchewan Election Results By Electoral Division

Former provincial electoral districts of Saskatchewan